The Fotheringham Crossing Pyramid  is a monument located on a hill on the bank of the Neuquén River, in the neighborhood of Sapere in Neuquén, Argentina, built to commemorate the crossing of the river by Colonel Fotheringham, Major Fábregras, and an unknown soldier in 1879, during the Conquest of the Desert.

Background 
At midday on June 11, 1879, an Argentine Army retinue led by Julio Roca, then Minister of War and the Navy, reached the confluence of the Neuquén and Limay Rivers during the Conquest of the Desert, a military campaign directed against the native population of Argentina.

Roca ordered the natives serving among his men to cross the river, but they were unable to do it and almost drowned. He then offered a reward of 2,000 pesos to whoever could cross. English-born Ignacio Hamilton Fotheringham, the commander of the 7th Infantry Regiment, took up the challenge, joined by Sergeant Fábregas and an unknown soldier.

The strong current knocked the three men out of their horses.

Monument 
The place of the crossing was declared a historic site on December 28, 1943. A sidewalk and cement benches were built around the monument. The original bronze plaques were stolen, and the pyramid has been repeatedly vandalized with graffiti.

Along with the Neuquén River bridge, the monument was depicted in the first test card of LU84 Canal 7, a local television channel, in 1965. Despite remaining little-known among the general public in Neuquén, the monument is considered to be a symbol of the neighborhood of Sapere by its inhabitants.

References

Monuments and memorials in Argentina
Neuquén